Ogilvy is a surname of Clan Ogilvy from Angus, Scotland, deriving from the Old Welsh words  ("high") and  ("place").

People with the surname
Andrew Ogilvy (born 1988), basketball player
Sir Angus Ogilvy (1928–2004), British businessman and husband of Princess Alexandra of Kent
Bernie Ogilvy, New Zealand politician
C. Stanley Ogilvy (1913–2000), American mathematician and sailor
David Ogilvy (disambiguation), various people
David Ogilvy (businessman) (1911–1999), British advertising executive
David Ogilvy (cricketer) (1859–1917), Australian cricketer
David Ogilvy, 9th Earl of Airlie (1785–1849), Scottish representative peer, Lord Lieutenant of Angus 1826–1849
David Ogilvy, 10th Earl of Airlie (1826–1881), his son, Scottish representative peer 
David Ogilvy, 11th Earl of Airlie (1856–1900), his son, Scottish soldier and representative peer
David Ogilvy, 12th Earl of Airlie (1893–1968), his son, Scottish Lord Chamberlain 1937–1965, 1936–1967
David Ogilvy, 13th Earl of Airlie (born 1926), his son, Scottish Lord Chamberlain from 1984, Lord Lieutenant of Angus from 1989
David Ogilvy (1804–1871), first president of the Law Institute of Victoria
Geoff Ogilvy (born 1977), Australian golfer
George Ogilvy, 2nd Lord Banff (died 1668), Scottish Royalist
George Ogilvy, 3rd Lord Banff (died 1713)
Ian Ogilvy (born 1943), English actor
James Ogilvy, several people
James Ogilvy (born 1964), member of the British royal family
James Ogilvy, 5th Lord Ogilvy of Airlie (died 1606), Scottish landowner and diplomat
James Ogilvy, 1st Earl of Airlie (1593–1666), Scottish royalist
James Ogilvy, 4th Earl of Findlater (1664–1730), Scottish politician
James Ogilvy, 6th Earl of Findlater (c. 1714–1770), Scottish earl
James Ogilvy, 7th Earl of Findlater (1750–1811), Scottish peer, amateur landscape architect and philanthropist
James Ogilvy-Grant, 9th Earl of Seafield (1817–1888), Scottish peer and member of parliament
John Ogilvy (disambiguation), several people
Sir John Ogilvy, 9th Baronet, MP for Dundee
John Ogilvy, agent of William Cecil, 2nd Earl of Exeter and James VI
John Ogilvy-Grant, 7th Earl of Seafield
Marion Ogilvy (died 1575), mistress of Cardinal Beaton
William Ogilvy, several people
William Ogilvy, 8th Baronet of Inverquharity ( 1765––1823)
William Ogilvy, Scottish politician and officer in the British Army,

Fictional characters
 Ogilvy, fake Oceanic soldier made up by Winston Smith in George Orwell's Nineteen Eighty-Four
 Ogilvy, astronomer in H. G. Wells' The War of the Worlds

See also
 Ogilvie (name)

References

Scottish surnames
Surnames of Scottish origin
Scottish toponyms
Surnames of British Isles origin